The concept of the Village Area Network or (VAN) was coined to demonstrate the importance of a networked community of technology users in small villages throughout the Yukon–Kuskokwim Delta in southwest Alaska.

The term was originally used by key members of the Distance Delivery Consortium (DDC) in 1997: H.A.'Red' Boucher; Rebecca Grandusky; Martin Leonard III; Curt Madison, and Robert Medinger.

Computer networks by scale